The Great Northern Football League is an Australian rules football league centred on the city of Geraldton in Western Australia, which was formed in 1961 as a merger of the Geraldton Football Association and the Northampton-Upper Chapman Football Association. It currently includes four clubs from Geraldton (Brigades, Railway, Rover and Towns) and one each from Mullewa, Northampton and Nabawa (Chapman Valley).

Clubs

Current

Previous
 Irwin Districts
 St Patrick's College

2011 ladder

2012 ladder

2013 ladder

2014 ladder

2015 ladder

2016 ladder

2017 ladder

References

Other references
http://www.gnfl.com.au/

Australian rules football competitions in Western Australia